General Lavalle (also known as Ajó) is a city located in the east of the province of Buenos Aires, Argentina. It's the administrative center of the partido of General Lavalle, and the General Lavalle municipality. It has a population of 3,046 (. The city, partido, and municipality, are named after Juan Lavalle (1797-1841), who was a military and political figure in the early years of the Argentine state.

The city is about a two-hour drive from Buenos Aires Ministro Pistarini International Airport. On the shores of the Ajó river, which flows from the interior of the province into Samborombón Bay, it has deep-waters port close to the sea.

Notes and references

External links

Populated places in Buenos Aires Province
Cities in Argentina
Argentina